The 1840 United States presidential election in Tennessee took place between October 30 and December 2, 1840, as part of the 1840 United States presidential election. Voters chose 15 representatives, or electors to the Electoral College, who voted for President and Vice President.

Tennessee voted for the Whig candidate, William Henry Harrison, over Democratic candidate Martin Van Buren. Harrison won Tennessee by a margin of 11.32%.

Results

References

Tennessee
1840
1840 Tennessee elections